Frank Dunn Berrien (August 17, 1877 January 31, 1951) was an American football coach and United States Navy officer.  He was the 13th head football coach for the United States Naval Academy located in Annapolis, Maryland and he held that position for three seasons, from 1908 until 1910.  His coaching record at Navy was 21–5–3.  As captain of the  he fought in the action of 17 November 1917. He later commanded the aircraft carrier .

Head coaching record

References

External links
 
 Frank Berrien on Together We Served

1877 births
1951 deaths
Navy Midshipmen football coaches
United States Navy personnel of World War I
United States Navy rear admirals
Burials at the United States Naval Academy Cemetery